Aaro Vainio (born 2 October 1993 in Espoo) is a Finnish racing driver, currently contesting in ADAC GT Masters.

Career

Karting
Vainio has enjoyed a successful karting career. He won the Finnish championship in 2007, and in 2008 he won the European KF3 Championship and the Junior Monaco Kart Cup. In 2009 he was runner-up in the CIK-FIA Karting World Championship and won the European KF1 Champion.

Formula Renault
In 2010 Vainio stepped up to single-seater racing, driving for Tech 1 Racing in the Eurocup Formula Renault 2.0. He had been expected to be part of the SG Formula team, but the team shut down. His manager was Nicolas Todt, son of FIA president Jean Todt and manager of Formula One driver Felipe Massa who had set a goal to get Vainio to Formula One in 2014. Vainio was also a candidate for the Ferrari Young Driver Academy, but was unsuccessful.

GP3 Series
For the 2011 racing season, Vainio moved into the GP3 series with Tech 1 Racing. He achieved a podium finish in his third race but only scored points twice during the remainder of the season, ultimately finishing 15th in the standings.

He remained in GP3 for 2012, moving to the Lotus GP team, where he took his maiden series win in the first ever GP3 race in Monaco. He finished the season fourth in the standings, behind António Félix da Costa, teammate Daniel Abt and champion Mitch Evans.

He is currently driving for the new team Koiranen GP.

Racing record

Career summary

Complete GP3 Series results
(key) (Races in bold indicate pole position) (Races in italics indicate fastest lap)

Complete Formula Renault 3.5 Series results
(key) (Races in bold indicate pole position) (Races in italics indicate fastest lap)

Complete Blancpain GT World Challenge Europe results
(key) (Races in bold indicate pole position) (Races in italics indicate fastest lap)

References

External links

 
Career statistics at Driver Database

1993 births
Living people
Sportspeople from Espoo
Finnish racing drivers
Formula Renault Eurocup drivers
British Formula Renault 2.0 drivers
Finnish GP3 Series drivers
World Series Formula V8 3.5 drivers
ART Grand Prix drivers
ADAC GT Masters drivers
Blancpain Endurance Series drivers
Tech 1 Racing drivers
Koiranen GP drivers
Euronova Racing drivers
Team Rosberg drivers
R-Motorsport drivers
Karting World Championship drivers